"Forever" is a song by American rock band the Beach Boys from their 1970 album Sunflower. It was written by Dennis Wilson and Gregg Jakobson. Dennis sang lead vocal. His brother Brian assisted with the arrangement.

Reception
Brian Wilson declared of the song, "'Forever' has to be the most harmonically beautiful thing I've ever heard. It's a rock and roll prayer." AllMusic reviewer Matthew Greenwalk wrote,

Other releases
 In 1972, American Spring, a duo consisting of Brian Wilson's then-wife Marilyn and her sister Diane Rovell released a version on their sole album, produced by Wilson.
 In 2003, an a cappella version of the song was included on the Beach Boys' compilation Hawthorne, CA.
 In 2021, session highlights, instrumental, and a cappella versions were included on the band's box set Feel Flows.

Jesse and the Rippers version
A newly recorded version of the song, featuring lead vocals from actor and Beach Boys sideman John Stamos, appeared on the band's 1992 album Summer in Paradise. Stamos performed the song on at least three episodes of his sitcom Full House. On the first episode of Fuller House in 2016, "Forever" was once again performed by Jesse and the Rippers with other characters from the show singing as well.

Charts

Personnel

Sourced from Craig Slowinski.

The Beach Boys
 Mike Love – harmony and backing vocals
 Brian Wilson – harmony and backing vocals
 Carl Wilson – harmony and backing vocals, acoustic guitar, Rocksichord
 Dennis Wilson – lead vocals, harmony and backing vocals, piano, tambourine, production
 Bruce Johnston – piano
Additional musicians
 Mike Anthony – electric guitar
 Jimmy Bond – arco double bass
 Lyle Ritz – bass
 Daryl Dragon – vibraphone
 Gene Estes – drums
 Frank Capp – tympani
 Orville “Red” Rhodes – pedal steel guitar
 Paul Beaver – Moog synthesizer
 Spiro Stamos, Roy Tanabe, Shari Zippert, Jay Rosen – violins

Additional production staff
 Stephen Desper – engineer
 Doc Siegel – additional engineer

References

External links
 

1970 songs
The Beach Boys songs
Songs written by Dennis Wilson
Song recordings produced by the Beach Boys
Reprise Records singles
Songs written by Gregg Jakobson